Morgan v. Illinois, 504 U.S. 719 (1992), is a case decided by the United States Supreme Court. The case established the right of defendants to challenge for cause any juror that would automatically impose the death penalty in all capital cases.

Background
In an elaboration of the Witherspoon v. Illinois (1968) doctrine, the Rehnquist Court considered challenges to the selection of jurors who would automatically vote to impose the death penalty on a defendant convicted of a capital offense. In a 6–3 decision, Justice White wrote for the majority that a defendant facing the death penalty may challenge for cause a prospective juror who would automatically vote to impose the death penalty in every case. Just as a juror who is unalterably opposed to the imposition of the death penalty must be excluded because he or she cannot conscientiously fulfill the oath to follow the law and the instructions to the jury pursuant thereto, so should one who would automatically vote to impose the death penalty be excluded for the same reason. Such a juror, he emphasized, would lack the qualities of impartiality and indifference required by due process. Furthermore, Justice White noted, jurors who would automatically vote to impose the death penalty would not "in good faith ... consider evidence of aggravating and mitigating circumstances" as may be required by law and included in jury instructions.

See also
 List of United States Supreme Court cases, volume 504
 List of United States Supreme Court cases
 Lists of United States Supreme Court cases by volume
 List of United States Supreme Court cases by the Rehnquist Court

Further reading

References

External links
 

United States Supreme Court cases
United States Supreme Court cases of the Rehnquist Court
Cruel and Unusual Punishment Clause and death penalty case law
United States Sixth Amendment jury case law
Capital punishment in Illinois
1992 in United States case law